Richard Cox House is a historic home located at Mattituck in Suffolk County, New York. It was originally constructed in 1826 in the Greek Revival style and extensively remodeled in the 1870s in the Italianate style.  The house features a cupola atop a low hipped roof. Also on the property is a -story, Stick-style former carriage barn.

It was added to the National Register of Historic Places in 1986.

References

Houses on the National Register of Historic Places in New York (state)
Queen Anne architecture in New York (state)
Italianate architecture in New York (state)
Houses completed in 1826
Houses in Suffolk County, New York
1826 establishments in New York (state)
National Register of Historic Places in Suffolk County, New York